John Urquhart may refer to:

John Urquhart (Canadian politician) (1844–1933), mayor of Oakville, Ontario, Canada
John Urquhart (sheriff) (born 1947), Sheriff of King County, Washington
John Urquhart (Washington politician) (1860–1925), American politician
John Urquhart (cricketer) (1921–2003), English cricketer
Johnny Urquhart (1925–2008), Scottish footballer

See also
John Urquhart Shorter (1844–1904), Confederate veteran and attorney
John Urquhart Cameron (born 1943), academic and social reformer